Sir David Baird, 1st Baronet was a British Army general. General Baird may also refer to:

Absalom Baird (1824–1905), Union Army brigadier general and brevet major general
Douglas Baird (Indian Army officer) (1877–1963) British Indian Army general
George W. Baird (1839–1906), U.S. Army brigadier general
James Baird (British Army officer) (1915–2007), British Army lieutenant general
Mark Baird (fl. 1980s–2010s) U.S. Air Force brigadier general
Ned Baird (1864–1956), British Army brigadier general